Anwara Begum was a Bangladeshi politician who was elected as member of 3rd Jatiya Sangsad of Reserved Seats for Women. She joined Jatiya Party (Kazi Zafor) from Jatiya Party of Hussain Muhammad Ershad in 2013. She was appointed a Presidium Member of Jatiya Party (Kazi Zafor). She died on 4 August 2019 at the age of 70.

References

People from Gazipur District
3rd Jatiya Sangsad members
1940s births
2019 deaths
Women members of the Jatiya Sangsad
20th-century Bangladeshi women politicians
Jatiya Party politicians